Alciopidae is a family of polychaetes belonging to the order Phyllodocida.

Genera:
 Alciopa Audouin & Milne Edwards, 1833
 Alciopina Claparède & Panceri, 1867
 Krohnia Quatrefages, 1866
 Naiades Delle Chiaje, 1830
 Plotohelmis Chamberlin, 1919
 Pseudalciopa Støp-Bowitz, 1991
 Rhynchonereella Costa, 1864
 Torrea Quatrefages, 1850
 Vanadis Claparède, 1870
 Watelio Støp-Bowitz, 1948

References

Phyllodocida